Wolverine Pass, 2218 m (7277 ft), is a mountain pass in the Chilcotin Ranges of the Pacific Ranges, the southernmost major subdivision of the Coast Mountains of British Columbia, Canada.  It is located between the headwaters of Gun Creek, a major north tributary of the Bridge River, and those of Slim Creek, which is a tributary of Gun Creek, and is part of the trail system within the Spruce Lake Protected Area (a.k.a. "Southern Chilcotins").

See also
List of mountain passes
Tyoax Pass
Griswold Pass
Warner Pass
Elbow Pass

References

Mountain passes of British Columbia
Bridge River Country
Chilcotin Ranges